Benjy's is a restaurant serving American cuisine in Houston, in the U.S. state of Texas.

History
The restaurant was established by Benjy Levit in 1985. Benjy's closed in 2020, on a temporary basis, during the COVID-19 pandemic.

Reception
In Condé Nast Traveler 2019 list of the city's 23 best restaurants, Charu Suri and Diane Oates wrote: "Here's the thing about Benjy's: Everyone will tell you it's their favorite restaurant—all for entirely different reasons. The brunch bunch will swear up and down that the French toast is the city's best hangover cure; the dinner crowd will point to the caramelized scallops as a near-religious experience. No one can agree on which dish—or even which meal—is best here, and that's what makes this place such a hit."

See also
 Impact of the COVID-19 pandemic on the restaurant industry in the United States

References

External links

 
 Benjy's at Condé Nast Traveler
 Benjy's at Houstonia
 Benjy's at Zagat
 Benjy's at Zomato

1985 establishments in Texas
2020 disestablishments in Texas
Defunct restaurants in Houston
Restaurants disestablished during the COVID-19 pandemic
Restaurants disestablished in 2020
Restaurants established in 1985